Mallamooppampatti is a census town in Salem district in the Indian state of Tamil Nadu.

Demographics
 India census, Mallamooppampatti had a population of 6783. Males constitute 52% of the population and females 48%. Mallamooppampatti has an average literacy rate of 53%, lower than the national average of 59.5%: male literacy is 61%, and female literacy is 45%. In Mallamooppampatti, 13% of the population is under 6 years of age.

References

Cities and towns in Salem district